CLAЯITY is the first album to be released by sifow. It includes the singles CLOVER and LOVE & PEACE. The DVD also contains the PV's for the singles, as well as Jewel.

Track listing
CLAЯITY
LOVE & PEACE
with you
image
Chain
Don't stop
CLOVER

tell me love!!
Rainbow's

My Dear
Bonus track：Jewel (Cyber NATION remix)

Bonus DVD:
Jewel music clip
CLOVER music clip
LOVE & PEACE music clip
Jewel TV SPOT
CLOVER TV SPOT
LOVE & PEACE TV SPOT

Sifow albums
2006 albums